Henderson Ryan (January 16, 1856 – August 29, 1927) was an American architect notable for designing buildings in Seattle Washington in the early 20th century, including several theaters and a significant number of residential apartment buildings. Among other buildings he was the architect of the Ballard Carnegie Library and Neptune Theatre, both Seattle city landmarks.

References

@Pacific Coast Architecture Database

1856 births
1927 deaths
Architects from Seattle